New Milford High School is a four-year, public, coeducational high school in New Milford, Connecticut. Currently, approximately 1,600 students attend the school. Although a majority of the students attending the school are from New Milford, others are from the nearby town of Sherman. The school is located at 388 Danbury Road in the town of New Milford and is a part of the New Milford School District. Other high schools in the district include the Canterbury School and the Faith Church Preparatory School, although New Milford High School is the only public high school.

Athletics
The New Milford High School Boys' cross-country (X-Country) team won its tenth consecutive Southwest Conference (SWC) title in 2011.

References

External links

 

New Milford, Connecticut
Schools in Litchfield County, Connecticut
Public high schools in Connecticut